William McGrotty (12 August 1952 – 3 July 2020) was a Scottish professional footballer who played as a winger.

Career
Born in Glasgow, McGrotty played for Yoker Athletic, Blackpool, Western Suburbs and Safeway United.

McGrotty died on 3 July 2020, aged 67.

References

1952 births
2020 deaths
Scottish footballers
Yoker Athletic F.C. players
Blackpool F.C. players
English Football League players
Association football wingers
Scottish expatriate footballers
Scottish expatriate sportspeople in Australia
Expatriate soccer players in Australia